Phalacrognathus muelleri, colloquially known as the Rainbow, King, Magnificent or Mueller's stag beetle, is a species of beetle in the family Lucanidae. It is found in northern Queensland, Australia and New Guinea. It can come in red, green, black, and blue forms. It is the only species in its genus, Phalacrognathus, which is closely related to the genus Lamprima.

Phalacrognathus muelleri has been the official symbol of the Entomological Society of Queensland since 1973.

Etymology
In 1885 the species was named Phalacrognathus muelleri by Sir William Macleay in honour of Baron Ferdinand von Mueller, the Victorian Government Botanist. The genus Phalacrognathus created at the same time.

Description
Males of Phalacrognathus muelleri are the largest members of the family Lucanidae in Australia.

Breeding
This species breeds in wet tropical areas. Up to 50 eggs can be laid by a female and these will take 10 to 14 days to hatch. The larva can be seen in the egg before emerging. The larvae are found in wet and rotting wood often in close proximity to white rot fungi and can take up to three years to mature.

Examples of fungi found proximate to breeding sites are: Ganoderma applanatum (Pers.) Patouillard, Nigrofomes melanoporus (Mont.) Murr., Phellinus nr. glaucescens (Petch) Ryvarden; Phellinus robustus (P. Karst) Baird, & Galz., Phellinus - 3 spp., and Pycnoporus sp.

Subspecies
The species is divided into the following two subspecies:

 Phalacrognathus muelleri muelleri — Queensland, Australia 
 Phalacrognathus muelleri fuscomicans — New Guinea

References

External links

 Photos of Phalacrognathus muelleri

Beetles described in 1885
Beetles of Oceania
Lampriminae